COBU may refer to:
Adenosylcobinamide kinase (also called CobU), an enzyme
Make Your Move 3D (formerly called Cobu 3D) a 2013 dance film